Paratype basivitta is a moth in the subfamily Arctiinae. It was described by Francis Walker in 1854. It is found in Rio de Janeiro, Brazil.

References

Lithosiini
Moths described in 1854